Bebearia arcadius, the Arcadian, is a butterfly in the family Nymphalidae. It is found in Guinea, Sierra Leone, Liberia, Ivory Coast and Ghana. The habitat consists of wetter forests.

Adults are attracted to fallen fruit.

References

Butterflies described in 1793
arcadius
Taxa named by Johan Christian Fabricius